Mr. Hook is the title character of a series of American animated cartoon shorts produced between 1943 and 1945 during World War II for the US Navy. The series included for 4 shorts with the first by Walter Lantz Productions being produced in full color and the remaining three produced by Warner Bros. Cartoons in black and white. The character was designed by Hank Ketcham. Unlike the earlier Private Snafu series, which was created as an instructional film series, Mr. Hook was created exclusively as propaganda to encourage Navy personnel to purchase war bonds.

Films

Take Heed Mr. Tojo

Directed by James Culhane and the only Hook cartoon by Walter Lantz Productions, Take Heed Mr. Tojo takes place in 1953, and we see Mr. Hook talking to his son about his time in the Navy, and how war bonds saved him from Japanese airplanes. Hook was voiced by Dick Nelson, and it was the only time he voiced him for the series.

The Return of Mr. Hook
The first short produced by Warner Bros. and directed by Robert McKimson. Hook tells his fellow sailors his plans for the money he will get when he redeems his bonds after the war, such as new clothes, a home and a wedding. From this point forward, Mr. Hook is voice by Arthur Lake.

Tokyo Woes
Directed by Bob Clampett, the short parodies the Tokyo Rose radio broadcasts in Japan, and it shows Mr. Hook shooting a naval gun round to Japan after Tokyo Rose criticized the usefulness of war bonds. The anthropomorphic war bond from the projectile later returns to Mr. Hook after the war to pay him for his bonds.

The Good Egg
Directed by Chuck Jones, Mr. Hook is woken up while a little angel and devil of himself argue whether he should spend or save his war bonds before he returns home. The angel soon wins the argument and tells Hook to save his bonds until he climbs back into civvies.

References

External links

 Take Heed Mr. Tojo on IMDB
 Take Heed Mr. Tojo on Youtube
 The Return of Mr. Hook on IMDB
 Tokyo Woes on IMDB
 The Good Egg on IMDB

Film characters introduced in 1943
Fictional sailors
Male characters in animation
Fictional American people
Mr. Hook
Mr. Hook
American black-and-white films
Animated human characters
1945 animated films
1945 films
1940s American animated films